The Owenbrean River ( or "stinking river"), is a small river in County Fermanagh, Northern Ireland which flows down from Cuilcagh Mountain before sinking underground, eventually reaching the Marble Arch Cave system.

Main route 

The Owenbrean flows underground through Pollasumera, until it sumps and appears again in nearby Pollnagollum of the Boats. During the guided tour of the Marble Arch Caves, visitors are led on a subterranean pathway alongside the Owenbrean River, as well as travelling upon it for a short while on an underground boat journey. The Owenbrean meets the combined Sruh Croppa and Aghinrawn at The Junction, which is halfway along the boat tour.

Separation 
Upstream of the main sinks in the blind gorge, the Owenbrean is also known to lose a portion of its flow as it is diverted into the Upper and Lower Sinks.

See also
Marble Arch Caves Global Geopark

Notes

References 
 

Rivers of County Fermanagh
Sinking rivers
Subterranean rivers of the United Kingdom